The Portage Terriers are a Canadian junior "A" ice hockey team from Portage la Prairie, Manitoba, Canada.  They are members of the Manitoba Junior Hockey League, a part of the Canadian Junior Hockey League.

History
The Portage Terriers were founded in 1932. Ten years later the Terriers won the Turnbull Cup as Manitoba junior champions and went on to defeat the Oshawa Generals to win the Memorial Cup. Their roster included Joe Bell, Gordon Bell, Billy Gooden, Lin Bend, Jack MacDonald, Wally Stefaniw, Bobby Love, Oliver "Bud" Ritchie, Bill Heindl Sr., Jack O'Reilly, Joe Ledoux, Lloyd Smith and Don Campbell.

A shortage of players following World War II forced the Terriers to cease operations in 1947.  The Portage Terriers would be reborn twenty years later as members of the new Central Manitoba Junior Hockey League.  The CMJHL lasted only one season before it merged with the MJHL. The Terriers became a Junior 'A' club following the reorganization of Canadian junior hockey in 1970.  In 1972-73, the Terriers won the ANAVET Cup as Manitoba-Saskatchewan champions and Abbott Cup as Western Canadian champions, and then defeated the Pembroke Lumber Kings to win the 1973 Centennial Cup.

The team endured some tough years following their Centennial Cup appearance and it was not until 1989 that the Terriers would recapture the league title. Since the mid-2000s, the Terriers have been the MJHL's most dominant franchise, winning nine Turnbull Cups, three ANAVET Cups, and one national championship (2015). 

During the 2014-15 season, the Terriers set a new league record by posting a winning percentage of .917 during the regular season, after which they went undefeated through the playoffs to capture the Turnbull Cup.  The Terriers finished second at the Western Canada Cup and then moved on to host the 2015 Royal Bank Cup in Portage la Prairie, where they captured the national title with a victory over the Carleton Place Canadians in the championship game. The 2020 national championship, rechristened as the Centennial Cup, was also to be played in Portage la Prairie but cancelled because of the coronavirus pandemic.

The Terriers have played at Stride Place, originally named the Portage Credit Union Centre, since 2010.  Prior to this, the Terriers played at the Portage Centennial Arena.  The team's head coach and general manager is Blake Spiller, who has held the position since 2006.  Spiller is the winningest coach in the team's history.

The 1942 and 1972-73 Portage Terriers have been inducted into the Manitoba Hockey Hall of Fame under the team category.

List of championships

Season-by-season record
Note: GP = Games Played, W = Wins, L = Losses, T = Ties, OTL = Overtime Losses, GF = Goals for, GA = Goals against

Playoffs

1971 Lost Quarter-final
Selkirk Steelers defeated Portage Terriers 4-games-to-2
1972 Lost Semi-final
Portage Terriers defeated Kenora Muskies 4-games-to-1
Dauphin Kings defeated Portage Terriers 4-games-to-none
1973 Won League, Won Man/Sask Championship, Won Abbott Cup, Won 1973 Centennial Cup
Portage Terriers defeated Kenora Muskies 4-games-to-none
Portage Terriers defeated St. James Canadians 4-games-to-none MJHL CHAMPIONS
Portage Terriers defeated Humboldt Broncos (SJHL) 3-games-to-2 and a default MAN/SASK CHAMPIONS
Portage Terriers defeated Penticton Broncos (BCJHL) 4-games-to-3 ABBOTT CUP CHAMPIONS
Portage Terriers defeated Pembroke Lumber Kings (CJHL) 4-games-to-1 CENTENNIAL CUP CHAMPIONS
1974 Lost Semi-final
Portage Terriers defeated Brandon Travellers 4-games-to-2
Selkirk Steelers defeated Portage Terriers 4-games-to-3
1975 Lost Semi-final
Portage Terriers defeated Dauphin Kings 4-games-to-none
Selkirk Steelers defeated Portage Terriers 4-games-to-1
1976 Lost Quarter-final
Brandon Travellers defeated Portage Terriers 4-games-to-1
1977 DNQ
1978 Lost Quarter-final
Selkirk Steelers defeated Portage Terriers 4-games-to-none
1979 Lost Semi-final
Portage Terriers defeated Dauphin Kings 4-games-to-3
Selkirk Steelers defeated Portage Terriers 4-games-to-none
1980 DNQ
1981 Lost Quarter-final
Dauphin Kings defeated Portage Terriers 4-games-to-none
1982 Lost Quarter-final
Selkirk Steelers defeated Portage Terriers 4-games-to-none
1983 Lost Quarter-final
Dauphin Kings defeated Portage Terriers 4-games-to-none
1984 Lost Quarter-final
Dauphin Kings defeated Portage Terriers 4-games-to-none
1985 DNQ
1986 DNQ
1987 Lost Quarter-final
Dauphin Kings defeated Portage Terriers 4-games-to-1
1988 Lost Final
Portage Terriers defeated Selkirk Steelers 4-games-to-1
Portage Terriers defeated Dauphin Kings 4-games-to-1
Winnipeg South Blues defeated Portage Terriers 4-games-to-none
1989 Lost Quarter-final
Selkirk Steelers defeated Portage Terriers 4-games-to-3
1990 Won League, Lost Anavet Cup
Portage Terriers defeated Winkler Flyers 4-games-to-1
Portage Terriers defeated Dauphin Kings 4-games-to-1
Portage Terriers defeated Kildonan North Stars 4-games-to-none MJHL CHAMPIONS
Nipawin Hawks (SJHL) defeated Portage Terriers 4-games-to-2
1991 Lost Quarter-final
Winkler Flyers defeated Portage Terriers 4-games-to-1
1992 Lost Semi-final
Portage Terriers defeated Dauphin Kings 4-games-to-1
Winkler Flyers defeated Portage Terriers 4-games-to-1
1993 Lost Semi-final
Portage Terriers defeated Neepawa Natives 4-games-to-none
Dauphin Kings defeated Portage Terriers 4-games-to-1
1994 Lost Quarter-final
Winkler Flyers defeated Portage Terriers 4-games-to-1
1995 Lost Quarter-final
Neepawa Natives defeated Portage Terriers 4-games-to-none
1996 Lost Quarter-final
Neepawa Natives defeated Portage Terriers 4-games-to-3
1997 Lost Quarter-final
OCN Blizzard defeated Portage Terriers 4-games-to-1
1998 Lost Quarter-final
OCN Blizzard defeated Portage Terriers 4-games-to-2
1999 Lost Quarter-final
Winkler Flyers defeated Portage Terriers 4-games-to-2
2000 Lost Quarter-final
Dauphin Kings defeated Portage Terriers 4-games-to-none
2001 Lost Quarter-final
Neepawa Natives defeated Portage Terriers 4-games-to-3
2002 Lost Semi-final
Portage Terriers defeated Neepawa Natives 4-games-to-1
OCN Blizzard defeated Portage Terriers 4-games-to-3
2003 Lost Semi-final
Portage Terriers defeated Swan Valley Stampeders 4-games-to-3
OCN Blizzard defeated Portage Terriers 4-games-to-1
2004 Lost Final
Portage Terriers defeated OCN Blizzard 4-games-to-none
Portage Terriers defeated Swan Valley Stampeders 4-games-to-2
Selkirk Steelers defeated Portage Terriers 4-games-to-none
2005 Won League, Won Anavet Cup, Lost in 2005 Royal Bank Cup round robin
Portage Terriers defeated OCN Blizzard 4-games-to-2
Portage Terriers defeated Neepawa Natives 4-games-to-1
Portage Terriers defeated Selkirk Steelers 4-games-to-2 MJHL CHAMPIONS
Portage Terriers defeated Yorkton Terriers (SJHL) 4-games-to-2 ANAVET CUP CHAMPIONS
Fifth and eliminated in 2005 Royal Bank Cup round robin (1-3)
2006 Lost Quarter-final
Dauphin Kings defeated Portage Terriers 4-games-to-2
2007 Lost Quarter-final
Neepawa Natives defeated Portage Terriers 4-games-to-3
2008 Won League, Lost Anavet Cup
Portage Terriers defeated Swan Valley Stampeders 4-games-to-3
Portage Terriers defeated Dauphin Kings 4-games-to-none
Portage Terriers defeated Winnipeg Saints 4-games-to-1 MJHL CHAMPIONS
Humboldt Broncos defeated Portage Terriers 4-games-to-none
2009 Won League, Lost Anavet Cup
Portage Terriers defeated Waywayseecappo Wolverines 4-games-to-none
Portage Terriers defeated Dauphin Kings 4-games-to-none
Portage Terriers defeated Selkirk Steelers 4-games-to-1 MJHL CHAMPIONS
Humboldt Broncos defeated Portage Terriers 4-games-to-3
2010 Lost Quarter-final
Swan Valley Stampeders defeated Portage Terriers 4-games-to-1
2011 Won League, Won Anavet Cup, Lost in 2011 Royal Bank Cup round robin
Portage Terriers defeated Swan Valley Stampeders 4-games-to-2
Portage Terriers defeated Dauphin Kings 4-games-to-2
Portage Terriers defeated Selkirk Steelers 4-games-to-1 MJHL CHAMPIONS
Portage Terriers defeated La Ronge Ice Wolves 4-games-to-3 ANAVET CUP CHAMPIONS
Fifth and eliminated from 2011 Royal Bank Cup round robin (1-3)
2012 Won League, Lost in 2012 Royal Bank Cup round robin
Portage Terriers defeated Selkirk Steelers 4-games-to-0
Portage Terriers defeated Winnipeg Blues 4-games-to-2
Portage Terriers defeated Winnipeg Saints 4-games-to-1 MJHL CHAMPIONS
Humboldt Broncos defeated Portage Terriers 4-games-to-3 
Fifth and eliminated from 2012 Royal Bank Cup round robin (1-3)
2013 Lost Quarter-final
Steinbach Pistons defeated Portage Terriers 4-games-to-3
2014 Lost Quarter-final
Steinbach Pistons defeated Portage Terriers 4-games-to-3
2015 Won League, WCC Runner-up, Won Royal Bank Cup
Portage Terriers defeated Waywayseecappo Wolverines 4-games-to-none
Portage Terriers defeated Virden Oil Capitals 4-games-to-none
Portage Terriers defeated Steinbach Pistons 4-games-to-none MJHL CHAMPIONS
Second in the 2015 Western Canada Cup round robin (3-1)
Penticton Vees defeated Portage Terriers 4-3 in WCC final
Portage Terriers defeated Melfort Mustangs 4-2 in WCC runner-up game
First in the 2015 Royal Bank Cup round robin (3-1)
Portage Terriers defeated Melfort Mustangs 6-1 in semi-final
Portage Terriers defeated Carleton Place Canadians 5-2 in final ROYAL BANK CUP CHAMPIONS
2016 Won League, Lost in WCC runner-up game
Portage Terriers defeated Selkirk Steelers 4-games-to-none
Portage Terriers defeated Winnipeg Blues 4-games-to-none
Portage Terriers defeated Steinbach Pistons 4-games-to-1 MJHL CHAMPIONS
Fourth in the 2016 Western Canada Cup round robin (2-1-1)
Melfort Mustangs defeated Portage Terriers 3-2 in runner-up game
2017 Won League, Lost in WCC round robin
Portage Terriers defeated Selkirk Steelers 4-games-to-2
Portage Terriers defeated Steinbach Pistons 4-games-to-2
Portage Terriers defeated OCN Blizzard 4-games-to-2 MJHL CHAMPIONS
Fifth and eliminated from 2017 Western Canada Cup round robin (1-3)
2018 Lost Quarter-final
Winnipeg Blues defeated Portage Terriers 4-games-to-2
2019 Won League, Won Anavet Cup, Lost in 2019 National Junior A Championship round robin
Portage Terriers defeated Waywayseecappo Wolverines 4-games-to-0
Portage Terriers defeated Virden Oil Capitals 4-games-to-0
Portage Terriers defeated Swan Valley Stampeders 4-games-to-3 MJHL CHAMPIONS
Portage Terriers defeated Battlefords North Stars 4-games-to-1 ANAVET CUP CHAMPIONS
Fifth and eliminated from 2019 National Junior A Championship round robin (0-4)
2020 Playoffs cancelled
Portage Terriers leading Dauphin Kings 2-games-to-1 when playoffs were cancelled due to COVID-19 pandemic2021 Playoffs cancelled2022 DNQ''

Notable executives
E. A. Gilroy, manager of the Terriers for the 1938–39 season

Notable alumni

Lin Bend
Rick Blight
Bryan Hextall
Jason Kasdorf
Junior Lessard
Dave McDonald
Curt Ridley
Black Jack Stewart
J. P. Vigier

See also
List of ice hockey teams in Manitoba

External links
Terriers Webpage
1942 Portage Terriers at Manitoba Hockey Hall of Fame
1973 Portage Terriers at Manitoba Hockey Hall of Fame

References 

Manitoba Junior Hockey League teams
Sport in Portage la Prairie
1942 establishments in Manitoba
Ice hockey clubs established in 1942